The Global Wildlife Center is a free-roaming wildlife preserve in Folsom, Louisiana. It is situated on a  preserve and hosts about 1000 animals. Visitors tour the facility in covered safari wagons or private 4x4 vehicles accompanied by a tour guide who teaches about animal facts and behaviors, habitat, conservation and more. Animal feed can be purchased by visitors to facilitate up close encounters with giraffes, bison, llamas and other exotic and endangered wildlife.

Founder Ken Matherne passed away in October 2021.Under new leadership.

References

Safari parks
Zoos in Louisiana